The United Kingdom declared war on Germany on 3 September 1939, two days after Germany invaded Poland. France also declared war on Germany later the same day.

The state of war was announced to the British public in an 11 AM radio broadcast by the prime minister Neville Chamberlain.

Historical context 

At the conclusion of the First World War, the German Empire signed the Armistice of 11 November 1918 as an end to hostilities with France, Britain, and the United States during the convoluted German Revolution of 1918–1919, which began on 29 October 1918.

Negotiations between the Allied powers regarding post-war Europe started on 18 January 1919 in the Salle de l'Horloge at the French Foreign Ministry on the Quai d'Orsay in Paris. Seventy delegates from 27 nations participated in the negotiations. The opposing nations of the German Empire and the Austro-Hungarian Empire were excluded from the negotiations. At first a "Council of Ten" comprising two delegates each from Britain, France, the United States, Italy and Japan met officially to decide the peace terms. It became the "Big Four" when Japan dropped out and the top person from each of the other four nations met in 145 closed sessions to make all the major decisions to be ratified by the entire assembly. In June 1919, the Allies declared that war would resume if the German government did not sign the treaty they had agreed to among themselves. The government headed by Philipp Scheidemann was unable to agree on a common position, and Scheidemann himself resigned rather than agree to sign the treaty. Gustav Bauer, the head of the new government, sent a telegram stating his intention to sign the treaty if certain articles were withdrawn, including articles 227, 230 and 231. In response, the Allies issued an ultimatum stating that Germany would have to accept the treaty or face an invasion of Allied forces across the Rhine within 24 hours. On 23 June 1919, Bauer capitulated and sent a second telegram with a confirmation that a German delegation would arrive shortly to sign the treaty.

On 28 June 1919, Germany signed the Treaty of Versailles, a peace treaty which ended the formal state of war and imposed various punitive measures upon Germany, including military restriction, loss of territory and colonies, war debt, and effective acceptance of blame for the initiation of hostilities in World War I. At the time of the armistice, an attempted Communist revolution transpired (October 1918-August 1919), resulting in the abdication of the Emperor of Germany on 9 November 1918, and what became known as the Weimar Republic was subsequently established in the wake of the uprising. The transition from monarchy to republic was difficult, and many in the new government were not supportive of the democratic system of government. The officer class gave little support to the Republic, and Germany was forced to borrow money from the United States and others to pay its war debt, imposed by the Treaty of Versailles. In the early 1920s a period of hyperinflation made the Mark almost worthless. In January 1922, one US dollar was worth 191 Marks, but by November of the same year it was equal to 4,200,000,000 Marks.

On 30 January 1933, Adolf Hitler was appointed Chancellor of the Reich following a contentious election. Under Hitler's leadership, the Reichstag turned the government into an effective dictatorship under Hitler's oversight on 21 March 1933 with the passage of the Enabling Act of 1933, and the economic hardships were significantly diminished via implementation of new economic and social policies. After five years in power, Hitler annexed Austria, former component of the Austro-Hungarian Empire (allies of the former German Empire), into Germany, despite such an act (specifically, "prohibition on the merging of Austria with Germany without the consent of the League of Nations") being banned by both the Treaty of Saint-Germain-en-Laye and the Treaty of Versailles. In early November 1938, the First Vienna Award was signed, allowing Germany to seize the Sudetenland, a German-speaking area of Czechoslovakia which had been a part of the German Empire-allied Austro-Hungarian Empire. Soon after, Germany invaded the rest of Czechoslovakia and also gained Memelland (part of the former German Empire from 1871–1920) through the 1939 German ultimatum to Lithuania.

Historical consensus of German motivations have highlighted that Hitler followed a policy of Lebensraum, or "living space", for Germany and this motivated his aggressive moves and acquisition of territory. Other sources claim evidence of hostility on behalf of Polish partisans toward ethnic Germans in the Danzig Corridor (territory lost to Germany as a result of the Treaty of Versailles) which may have served as a motivating factor for the German invasion (often portrayed as propaganda to justify German expansionism).

Two Western powers, the United Kingdom and France, gave guarantees to Poland that they would declare war if Polish independence came under threat, as presented in a statement to the House of Commons by the British Prime Minister Neville Chamberlain on 31 March 1939 (formalized by the British on 6 April 1939; not ratified until 4 September 1939 by the French):

After the declaration of war 
The Royal Navy initiated a naval blockade of Germany on 4 September.
Although Britain and France honoured these guarantees by declaring war two days after Germany's invasion of Poland on 1 September 1939, and the dominions of the British Empire quickly followed suit, so little practical assistance was given to Poland, which was soon defeated, that in its early stages the war declared by Britain and France was described as a "Phoney War".

Further, neither the British Empire nor the French ever declared war upon the Soviet Union, which invaded Poland on 17 September 1939 (16 days after Nazi Germany invaded from the West). The Polish ambassador in London, Edward Bernard Raczyński, contacted the British Foreign Office to point out that clause 1(b) of the agreement, which concerned an "aggression by a European power" on Poland, should apply to the Soviet invasion. Foreign Secretary Lord Halifax responded that the obligation of British Government towards Poland arising out of the Anglo-Polish Agreement was restricted to Germany, according to the first clause of the secret protocol. The Soviet Union held sway over the former Polish territory at the war's conclusion, having become a part of the Allies in the course of World War II. At the insistence of Joseph Stalin, the post-war Yalta Conference in 1945 sanctioned the formation of a new provisional pro-Communist coalition government in Moscow, which ignored the Polish government-in-exile based in London.

See also 
Canadian declaration of war on Germany
Declarations of war by Great Britain and the United Kingdom
 Declarations of war during World War II
 Diplomatic history of World War II
French declaration of war on Germany (1939)
Military history of the United Kingdom during World War II
United Kingdom declaration of war on Japan

References 

Declarations of war during World War II
France in World War II
United Kingdom in World War II
British Empire in World War II
September 1939 events
France–Germany military relations
Germany–United Kingdom military relations
France–United Kingdom military relations
1939 documents
Germany in World War II